Careliopsis modesta is a species of sea snail, a marine gastropod mollusk in the family Pyramidellidae, the pyrams and their allies. The species is one of three species within the Careliopsis genus of gastropods, with the exception of the others being Careliopsis clathratula and Careliopsis styliformis.

Distribution
This marine species is distributed in European waters, populous areas for this species include the Bay of Biscay, Mediterranean Sea and the Irish Sea.

References

External links
 To CLEMAM
 To Encyclopedia of Life
 To World Register of Marine Species

Pyramidellidae
Gastropods described in 1870